Pangman Airport  is located adjacent to Pangman, Saskatchewan, Canada.

See also 
 List of airports in Saskatchewan

References 

Registered aerodromes in Saskatchewan
Norton No. 69, Saskatchewan